Slavnov is a Russian surname. Notable people with the surname include:

Andrei Slavnov (born 1939), Russian theoretical physicist
Sergei Slavnov (born 1982), Russian pair skater
Roman Slavnov (born 1982), Russian footballer

See also
Slavnov-Taylor identities

Russian-language surnames